Kristian Merrill Bush (born March 14, 1970) is an American singer, songwriter, and record producer. Bush is one half of the country music duo Sugarland with Jennifer Nettles, and was a member of the folk rock duo Billy Pilgrim with Andrew Hyra. In addition to his work in these two groups, Bush has released one solo album, Southern Gravity, via Streamsound Records in 2015, he was also featured as Shugabush in the game My Singing Monsters.

Early life
Kristian Bush was born in Knoxville, Tennessee. He is the great grandson of A.J. Bush, founder of Bush Brothers and Company; his part of the family sold their shares in the company when Bush was a child, although Kristian's cousin, Jay Bush, continues as company spokesman.  Bush was raised outside of Knoxville in Sevierville, Tennessee, a small town at the base of the Smoky Mountains that was also the hometown of Dolly Parton. He was exposed to instruments from an early age, and picked up his first violin at age 4. During these early years, Bush, alongside younger brother Brandon, made his musical debut at the local Bush Beans Jamboree performing as Parton's opening act.

Throughout childhood, Bush was enrolled in violin lessons and classically trained under the Suzuki method at the University of Tennessee.  The family eventually relocated to Knoxville and by age 11, Bush agreed to play one season in the Knoxville Youth Symphony, before earning the right to lay the violin down for good and start learning the guitar.  As a teenager, Bush stuck with the guitar and began to create original music. It wasn't long before he was writing his own songs and recording homemade albums.

Bush attended Avon Old Farms Boarding School in Avon, Connecticut, graduating in 1988. He then attended Emory University in Atlanta, earning a degree in Creative Writing.  During college, Bush began to connect with Atlanta's growing music scene, often begging his way into clubs, witnessing first-hand success from bands like R.E.M. and (fellow Emory students) the Indigo Girls.

Musical career
While attending Emory University, Bush was the lead singer and guitarist in the rock band Storyteller, with fellow Emory students Chris "Tex" Nolter (bass, guitar) and Jon Slatkin (drums). Storyteller covered the Replacement's "I Can't Wait”, Rod Stewart's "Maggie May”, The English Beat's "Mirror in the Bathroom", and Jane's Addiction's "Jane Says”, among other songs, and they performed at numerous bars, campus events and parties in Atlanta.

Billy Pilgrim

Bush started his career in the early 1990s forming folk rock duo Billy Pilgrim along with Andrew Hyra. Bush and Hyra originally met in Knoxville after Hyra relocated to Tennessee with his sister Annie to pursue music together as a brother-sister duo, the Hyras. Bush had made a number of studio contacts while in college and he and the Hyras began performing together. Annie lent her voice to Bush's Politics and Pocketchange album, and Bush played guitar on the Hyras' Big Back Porch Songs. Bush was recruited to fill in for a string of Hyra's shows when Annie parted ways for a job in Florida.

As a new duo, Bush and Hyra soon relocated to Atlanta and began to gain a following with a place for themselves among the acoustic scene and songwriting community. They performed on Emory's campus occasionally under their names, before they chose a moniker for the duo. Bush and Hyra decided upon the name Billy Pilgrim (borrowed from the time traveling protagonist of Kurt Vonnegut's Slaughterhouse Five) and released a pair of albums for Atlantic Records (their 1994 self-titled debut and 1995's Bloom), earning multiple Top 5 singles on the AAA charts, rotation on VH1 and a reputation as dynamic live performers who traveled from the tiny stage of Eddie's Attic in Decatur, Georgia, to a worldwide tour supporting Melissa Etheridge in 1995.

Sugarland

Bush co-founded Sugarland in 2002, signed with Mercury Records Nashville in 2004, and exploded onto the country music scene. They have surpassed sales of over 22 million albums worldwide, achieved five No. 1 singles and won numerous awards, including trophies from the Grammys, American Music Awards, Academy of Country Music Awards, CMT Music Awards and CMA Awards.

Sugarland broke through in 2004 with the release of their debut single "Baby Girl", the first single from their multi-platinum debut album Twice the Speed of Life. The trio became a duo in 2006, when they also released their second album, Enjoy the Ride. This album produced their first two No. 1 singles (in the U.S.), "Want To" and "Settlin'", and won the duo a Grammy for "Stay". In 2008 they released their third album, titled Love on the Inside. This album produced three more No. 1 singles with "All I Want to Do", "Already Gone"and "It Happens". Their fourth album, The Incredible Machine was released on October 19, 2010 in both a standard and deluxe edition. Upon The Incredible Machine being certified platinum, Sugarland has sold in excess of 14 million records. Nettles and Bush also write all of the band's songs. In October of 2012, they were inducted into the Georgia Music Hall of Fame.

At the 51st Annual Country Music Association Awards in 2017, Sugarland officially reunited following a five year hiatus and announced that they were working on new music together. Their first full-band shows were at the C2C: Country to Country festival in March 2018. Their sixth studio album, Bigger was released on June 8, 2019.

Solo
To date, Bush has won six BMI Awards for his songwriting abilities, and in 2011 he founded the music publishing company and songwriting collective Songs of the Architect. Recent producing and songwriting collaborations include Ellis Paul, Laura Bell Bundy, Matt Nathanson, the dB’s, Martin Johnson of Boys Like Girls, Pretty Little Liars star Lucy Hale, and up-and-comers including Kristina Train, Larkin Poe, Canaan Smith, Lauren Alaina, Jaida Dreyer and Alana Springsteen.

Bush made his solo debut in March 2013 at the inaugural C2C: Country to Country Festival at the O2 Arena in London, England; his first single as a solo act, "Love or Money," debuted on iTunes in Europe the following week, along with an official lyric video  released on YouTube for fans back home in the States.  He often takes part in the Country Music Association's Songwriters Series, which has included various appearances across the United States, as well as time spent abroad with the CMA's first-ever international initiative showcasing Nashville songwriters and their work to foreign audiences in clubs and theaters.  Bush is also a frequent panelist and speaker at events for the National Academy of Recording Arts and Sciences.

In July 2013, Bush collaborated with Canada-based computer and video game developer Big Blue Bubble, to become the latest character, and first celebrity guest in the hit online game, My Singing Monsters. Bush became a fan of the game after being introduced to it by his 11-year-old son. He then took his liking of the game to his Twitter account, and was soon connected with head developer Dave Kerr. Bush received an invitation to guest star and made his debut as the all-new "Shugabush" monster on July 29, 2013. Bush provides his own mandolin and vocal recordings for the character. A new island was also added to the game, called Shugabush Island, with a song that highly resembled Bush's " Love Or Money ".

On October 10, 2013, "Love or Money" was remixed by longtime Sugarland producer Byron Gallimore and released to iTunes in the United States. After the collaboration, Gallimore asked to hear more of Bush's solo music, and subsequently signed him to his own label, Streamsound Records.

Bush's debut solo single, "Trailer Hitch", was released on July 28, 2014. His first solo album, Southern Gravity, was released on April 7, 2015. He wrote over 300 songs for the project, which he refers to as a “mainstream country record that is meant to be played on the radio.”

On February 5, 2016, it was announced that Bush has signed a new publishing, producing, and label deal with Broken Bow Records, where he will record under their imprint Wheelhouse Records.

"Forever Now (Say Yes)", written and performed by Bush, became the new theme song for the TLC reality series Say Yes to the Dress when their 14th season premiered on March 4, 2016. Bush also makes a guest appearance on the show later in the season.

Bush collaborated with playwright Janece Shaffer on Troubadour, a romantic comedy set in 1950s Nashville (featuring original songs by Bush) that was scheduled to make its debut at the Alliance Theatre in Atlanta, Georgia on January 28, 2017. In March 2017, he returned to the C2C: Country to Country festival, headlining the CMA songwriters series.

On May 31, 2019, Bush released a new EP, Summertime Six Pack.

Bush has also co-written with actress and singer Rita Wilson on three of her albums; Rita Wilson, Bigger Picture, and Halfway to Home. He will be touring will Wilson in 2019.

Dark Water
In 2019 Bush formed a new band with his brother Brandon, and friend Benji Shanks called Dark Water. He calls the band "an amazing experience", and he "can't wait for people to hear it."

Radio
On BBC Radio 2 Country, Bush presented 'Country Duos', selecting some of his favourite country songs. He presented coverage of the 2017 CMA Music Festival on BBC Radio 2.

Personal life
Bush has a son and a daughter from his marriage, which ended in 2011.

Bush's brother Brandon is a former member of the rock group Train, and also tours with Sugarland and Kristian's solo project as a keyboardist.

Awards and accolades
 2012 Named Distinguished Alumnus, Avon Old Farms School 
 2011 CMA Awards Vocal Duo of the Year - Sugarland 
 2011 CMT Music Awards Duo Video of the Year - Sugarland, "Stuck Like Glue" 
 2011 ACM Awards Top Vocal Duo - Sugarland 
 2010 CMA Awards Vocal Duo of the Year - Sugarland 
 2009 CMA Awards Vocal Duo of the Year - Sugarland 
 2009 CMT Music Awards Duo Video of the Year - Sugarland, "All I Want To Do" 
 2009 ACM Awards Top Vocal Duo - Sugarland 
 2009 Grammy Awards Best Country Performance by a Duo or Group - Sugarland, "Stay" 
 2009 Grammy Awards Best Country Song - Sugarland, "Stay" 
 2008 CMA Awards Vocal Duo of the Year - Sugarland 
 2008 CMT Music Awards Duo Video of the Year - Sugarland, "Stay" 
 2008 ACM Awards Single of the Year - Sugarland, "Stay" 
 2007 CMA Awards Vocal Duo of the Year - Sugarland 
 2007 CMT Awards Duo Video of the Year - Sugarland, "Want To" 
 2006 ACM Awards Top New Duo or Vocal Group - Sugarland 
 2005 American Music Awards Favorite Breakthrough New Artist - Sugarland

Discography

Solo releases
 Paint It All (2002) 
 "Love or Money" [single] (2013)
 "Trailer Hitch" [single] (2014)

Billy Pilgrim
 St. Christopher's Crossing (1992)  
 Words Like Numbers (1993)  
 Billy Pilgrim (1994)  
 Bloom (1995)  
 In the Time Machine (2001)

Sugarland

 Premium Quality Tunes (2003)
 Sugar in the Raw (2003)
 Twice the Speed of Life (2004)
 Enjoy the Ride (2006)
 Love on the Inside (2008)
 Live on the Inside (2009)
 Gold and Green (2009)
 The Incredible Machine (2010)

Studio albums

Singles

Music videos

References

External links
Kristian Bush Website
Kristian Bush talks about music and Southern Gravity on Ben Sorensen's REAL Country

1970 births
21st-century American male singers
21st-century American singers
American country singer-songwriters
American male singer-songwriters
American mandolinists
BBR Music Group artists
Big Machine Records artists
Country musicians from Tennessee
Grammy Award winners
Living people
People from Sevierville, Tennessee
Sugarland members
Streamsound Records artists
Avon Old Farms alumni
Singer-songwriters from Tennessee